Ontonagon Township  is a civil township of Ontonagon County in the U.S. state of Michigan. The population was 2,253 at the 2020 census.

Communities 
 The village of Ontonagon is located within the township.

Geography

Demographics
As of the census of 2000, there were 2,954 people, 1,281 households, and 809 families residing in the township.  The population density was 15.3 per square mile (5.9/km).  There were 1,694 housing units at an average density of 8.8 per square mile (3.4/km).  The racial makeup of the township was 97.60% White, 0.85% Native American, 0.14% Asian, 0.17% from other races, and 1.25% from two or more races. Hispanic or Latino of any race were 0.58% of the population.

There were 1,281 households, out of which 25.8% had children under the age of 18 living with them, 51.9% were married couples living together, 7.1% had a female householder with no husband present, and 36.8% were non-families. 33.3% of all households were made up of individuals, and 16.3% had someone living alone who was 65 years of age or older.  The average household size was 2.19 and the average family size was 2.76.

In the township the population was spread out, with 21.3% under the age of 18, 3.9% from 18 to 24, 23.4% from 25 to 44, 28.9% from 45 to 64, and 22.4% who were 65 years of age or older.  The median age was 46 years. For every 100 females, there were 96.4 males.  For every 100 females age 18 and over, there were 93.8 males.

The median income for a household in the township was $32,308, and the median income for a family was $41,607. Males had a median income of $38,030 versus $21,715 for females. The per capita income for the township was $17,802.  About 5.2% of families and 10.1% of the population were below the poverty line, including 10.7% of those under age 18 and 10.7% of those age 65 or over.

References

Townships in Ontonagon County, Michigan
Townships in Michigan
Michigan populated places on Lake Superior